Matt McGinn is a Nashville based multi-platinum, award winning songwriter and producer.

Awards and nominations

Songwriting Discography

References

External links 
 Matthew McGinn | Credits | AllMusic

Living people
Year of birth missing (living people)